Cottage Gallery was an art gallery that was located in Carmel, California.  It was owned and operated by George Goff.  It opened in November 1984, and closed in 2001. The significance of the Gallery is primarily due to the involvement of artist Thomas Kinkade who was a friend of Goffs.  Kinkade suggested the name, Cottage Gallery, because of Carmel's quaint look and because of the actual building that the Gallery was located in had a pseudo-cottage feel. The Gallery was located at the corner of Sixth and Mission. In addition, Kinkade also designed the Gallery's logo which appeared on the main wood sign outdoors, all stationary and secondary collateral material. Cottage Gallery was one of the first galleries in which Kinkade started showing his fine art paintings in. Kinkade also produced paintings under a “brush name” of Robert Girrard. Cottage Gallery was the only gallery that showed the “Robert Girrard” paintings of Kinkade. For decades there were only a handful of people who knew that Robert Girrard and Thomas Kinkade were one and the same. The gallery mostly showed original oil paintings by living artists.

Artists represented by Cottage Gallery 

 Tom Browning
 Lindsay Dawson
 Robert Girrard (a.k.a. Thomas Kinkade)
 Thomas Kinkade
 John Terelak
 Barry Thomas
 Edward Ward
 Sha-Kong Wang
 Edward Glafke
 Dave DeMatteo

References 

 The faqs page at Girrard.com

Defunct art museums and galleries in California
Buildings and structures in Monterey County, California
History of Monterey County, California
Art galleries established in 1984
Art galleries disestablished in 2001
1984 establishments in California
2001 disestablishments in California
Carmel-by-the-Sea, California